The Chile national basketball team is controlled by the Federación de Básquetbol de Chile. It is affiliated to FIBA, under the zone confederation of FIBA Americas.

In the 1950s, Chile had one of the finest national basketball teams in the world. In more recent years team has primarily competed regionally at the FIBA South American Championship.

Competitive record

Olympic Games

FIBA World Cup

FIBA AmeriCup
yet to qualify

Pan American Games

 1951 : 5th
2019 : Did not qualify
2023 : Qualified as host

FIBA South American Championship

Team

Current squad
Source: Official website

|}
| valign="top" |
Head coach

Assistant coaches

Legend
Club – denotes current club
|}

National team rosters
Chile national basketball team rosters

Past head coaches

See also
Chile men's national under-18 basketball team
Chile men's national under-17 basketball team
Chile women's national basketball team

References

External links 
 FIBA Chile
 www.febachile.cl
 Archived records of Chile team participations

Videos
Chile v Marquette University 1972
Chile v Peru - Game Highlights 2016 South American Championship

 
Men's national basketball teams
1935 establishments in Chile